"Necessary" is a song by the Japanese J-pop group Every Little Thing, released as their tenth single on September 30, 1998.

Track listing
 Necessary (Words & music - Mitsuru Igarashi) 
 Necessary (D'Ambrosio club mix)
 Necessary (instrumental)

Chart positions

External links
 "Necessary" information at Avex Network.
 "Necessary" information at Oricon.

1998 singles
Every Little Thing (band) songs
Songs written by Mitsuru Igarashi